The 2016 Mid-American Conference men's soccer season was the 24th season of men's varsity soccer in the conference.

The Akron Zips are both the defending regular season and conference tournament champions.

Changes from 2015 

 None

Teams

Stadiums and locations 

 Ball State, Eastern Michigan, Kent State, Miami, Ohio, and Toledo do not sponsor men's soccer. West Virginia is an associated member.

Regular season

Results

Rankings

NSCAA National

NSCAA Great Lakes Regional

Postseason

MAC tournament

NCAA tournament

All-MAC awards and teams

See also 
 2016 NCAA Division I men's soccer season
 2016 MAC Men's Soccer Tournament
 2016 Mid-American Conference women's soccer season

References 

 
2016 NCAA Division I men's soccer season